The 2021 Hollywood Casino 400 was a NASCAR Cup Series race held on October 24, 2021, at Kansas Speedway in Kansas City, Kansas. Contested over 267 laps on the  intermediate speedway, it was the 34th race of the 2021 NASCAR Cup Series season, the eighth race of the Playoffs, and second race of the Round of 8.

Report

Background

Kansas Speedway is a  tri-oval race track in Kansas City, Kansas. It was built in 2001 and it currently hosts two annual NASCAR race weekends. The Verizon IndyCar Series also raced at here until 2011. The speedway is owned and operated by the International Speedway Corporation.

Entry list
 (R) denotes rookie driver.
 (i) denotes driver who are ineligible for series driver points.

Qualifying
Kyle Larson was awarded the pole for the race as determined by competition-based formula.

Starting Lineup

Race

Kyle Larson started from the pole position. Larson won Stage 1 and William Byron won Stage 2. Kyle Busch and Brad Keselowski were involved in incidents during the race while Ryan Blaney wrecked out of the race with 44 laps to go. Larson won the race, his third consecutive win and ninth for the season. He became the second driver after Joey Logano in 2015 to win three consecutive "post-season" races. He is the fourth driver in NASCAR "post-season" history to win four races in the post-season, following Jimmie Johnson, Tony Stewart, and Martin Truex Jr.

Stage Results

Stage One
Laps: 80

Stage Two
Laps: 80

Final Stage Results

Stage Three
Laps: 107

Race statistics
 Lead changes: 23 among 8 different drivers
 Cautions/Laps: 7 for 33
 Red flags: 1 for 15 minutes and 46 seconds
 Time of race: 3 hours, 3 minutes and 49 seconds
 Average speed:

Media

Television
NBC Sports covered the race on the television side. Rick Allen, Jeff Burton, Steve Letarte and Dale Earnhardt Jr. called the race from the broadcast booth. Dave Burns, Marty Snider and Dillon Welch handled the pit road duties from pit lane. Parker Kligerman provided updates from the driver’s perspective while competing in the No. 96 Gaunt Brothers Racing car during the race.

Radio
MRN had the radio call for the race, which was simulcast on Sirius XM NASCAR Radio. Alex Hayden, Jeff Striegle and Rusty Wallace called the race for MRN when the field raced thru the front straightaway. Dave Moody called the race for MRN from Turns 1 & 2, and Mike Bagley called the race for MRN from turns 3 & 4. Steve Post and Kim Coon covered the action for MRN from pit lane.

Standings after the race

Drivers' Championship standings

Manufacturers' Championship standings

Note: Only the first 16 positions are included for the driver standings.

References

2021 in sports in Kansas
Hollywood Casino 400
NASCAR races at Kansas Speedway
Hollywood Casino 400